O'Connor Mine, also known as Milestone Mine, is an abandoned surface mine in Northeastern Ontario, Canada. It is named after John O'Connor who first developed the mine site.

Development consisted of several small open pits and trenches. The primary commodities mined at O'Connor was copper, sulfur/pyrite and nickel. Secondary commodities included gold and zinc. A number of small lenses of massive pyrite with much disseminated material have been opened up along the foot-wall of a sheared diorite sill near the northeastern arm of Lake Temagami. Some of the mined material was shipped.

See also
List of mines in Temagami

References

Mines in Temagami
Sulfur mines in Canada
Copper mines in Ontario
Nickel mines in Canada
Gold mines in Ontario
Zinc mines in Canada
Surface mines in Canada